is a railway station in the city of Kurobe, Toyama, Japan, operated by the private railway operator Toyama Chihō Railway.

Lines

Station layout 
The station has one ground-level side platform serving a single bi-directional track. The station is unattended.

History
Nagaya Station was opened on 5 November 1922.

Adjacent stations

Surrounding area 
Hokuriku Expressway

See also
 List of railway stations in Japan

External links

 

Railway stations in Toyama Prefecture
Railway stations in Japan opened in 1922
Stations of Toyama Chihō Railway
Kurobe, Toyama